Sveto Todori is a village in the municipality of Mogila, North Macedonia.

Demographics
According to the 2002 census, the village had a total of 210 inhabitants. Ethnic groups in the village include:

Macedonians 210

References

Villages in Mogila Municipality